The Premanand Suvarna Chandrak or Premanand Gold Medal is a literary honour awarded every two years, though sometimes annually, to an established Gujarati writer in order to recognize and promote excellence in Gujarati writing. It is given by an institute of literature, the Premanand Sahitya Bhavan of Vadodara, in remembrance of the Gujarati poet with which it shares its name, Premanand Bhatt. Established in 1916 as the Gujarati Sahitya Sabha and renamed to be the Premanand Sahitya Bhavan in 1944, the organization and institute started this medal in 1983.

Recipients 

List of recipients:

References

Awards established in 1983
Gujarati literary awards
1983 establishments in Gujarat